LetsRun.com is a Fort Worth-based news website and internet forum for information and discussion related to track and field, especially long-distance running.

Brothers Robert and Weldon Johnson founded LetsRun.com in the spring of 2000 while Weldon was training for the U.S. Olympic Trials in Flagstaff, Arizona, with the goal of creating an online community to facilitate discussion of race results and training as well as to help promote track and field in the United States. According to the Johnsons, in 2009 the website was receiving over 200,000 unique visitors per month, and as of 2020 there have been nearly ten million posts on its message board.

Despite concerns over sexism and racism and limited moderation on the message boards, LetsRun.com has been praised for its positive impact on American running and source of importance for the field. It has also become known for the quality of training information on its boards, and a number of internationally recognized coaches and athletes have posted information on their workout plans on the site, including Renato Canova and Henry Rono.

Running controversies
LetsRun has also appeared at the center of several controversies in running. In 2015, following a viral post made by Mike Rossi justifying his children's absences from school while watching him run at the Boston Marathon, Robert Johnson wrote a 5,000 word article on LetsRun describing "overwhelming" evidence that Rossi had cheated in an earlier qualifying race, based in part on information discovered by various users and posted to the LetsRun message boards. The organizers of that qualifying race wrote that they could not disqualify Rossi's time "simply because they received no reports of wrongdoing as the race took place," but also stated that "there is data from Rossi’s participation in other racing events indicating that Rossi’s time may not be accurate." 

LetsRun was also involved in scrutiny of Robert Young's attempt to break the record for the fastest run across the United States in 2016. As skepticism of some of Young's splits grew, one anonymous poster attempted to meet Young in the middle of his run, but instead found Young's support R.V. driving slowly down the road at running speed with no one outside, leading the poster to accuse Young of riding in the R.V. while claiming to be running. Young's performance deteriorated as additional observers began following his progress, and he eventually abandoned the attempt.

See also 
 List of Internet forums

References

External links
 

Internet forums
Sport websites
Running mass media
American sport websites